Eugene Lang is Assistant Professor (continuing adjunct), School of Policy Studies, Queen's University, Senior Fellow, Bill Graham Centre for Contemporary International History, Trinity College, University of Toronto and Fellow, Canadian Global Affairs Institute.  He was a former chief of staff to two of Canada’s Liberal ministers of defence from 2002 to 2006. Lang co-authored with Janice Gross Stein the book The Unexpected War: Canada in Kandahar (Penguin, 2007).

The Liberal Party, after dominating Canadian politics since the 1920s, has been in decline in the 21st century. As Lang (2010) concludes, they lost their majority in Parliament in the 2004 election, were defeated in 2006, and in 2008 became little more than a rump, falling to their lowest seat count and popular vote since the 1980s. Furthermore, says Lang, its prospects "are as bleak as they have ever been."

Experience
Eugene Lang has thirty years experience at senior levels in the public and private sector. He served twelve years in the federal government in senior advisory roles, including chief of staff to two Ministers of National Defence (the Honourable John McCallum and the Honourable Bill Graham), chief of staff to the Secretary of State (Finance), Senior Economist, Finance Canada, Senior Policy Advisor (economic) to the Deputy Prime Minister of Canada, the Right Honourable Herb Gray and Policy Advisor to the Solicitor General of Canada.

Education
Lang was educated at University of Western Ontario (B.A., M.A.), Queen's University (M.P.A.) and the London School of Economics (M.Sc.), where he studied as a Chevening Scholar.

References

See also 
Robert R. Fowler

Living people
Year of birth missing (living people)